The Lumber Exchange Building is in Minneapolis, Minnesota, listed on the NRHP in Hennepin County, Minnesota.

Lumber Exchange Building may also refer to: 

Lumber Exchange Building (South Bend, Washington), listed on the National Register of Historic Places in Pacific County, Washington
Lumber Exchange Building in Seattle, designed by Saunders and Lawton
Roanoke Building, Chicago, Illinois, listed on the NRHP as the Lumber Exchange Building and Tower Addition
Grain and Lumber Exchange Building, Winona, Minnesota